Pitis is a station on Line 7 of the Madrid Metro and the northern terminus of that line. It is located in fare Zone A. The station offers connection to Cercanías Madrid via Pitis railway station.

References 

Line 7 (Madrid Metro) stations
Railway stations in Spain opened in 1999